Lacetas is a genus of cicadas in the family Cicadidae, and the tribe Hemidictyini found in Africa. There are at least four described species in Lacetas.

Species
These four species belong to the genus Lacetas:
 Lacetas annulicornis Karsch, 1890
 Lacetas breviceps Schumacher, 1912
 Lacetas jacobii Schumacher, 1912
 Lacetas longicollis Schumacher, 1912

References

Further reading

 
 
 
 
 
 

Tettigomyiinae
Cicadidae genera